Boubakour Benbouzid was the minister of higher education for Algeria in the 1995 government of Mokdad Sifi.

References

Living people
Year of birth missing (living people)
Education ministers of Algeria
Place of birth missing (living people)
20th-century Algerian politicians